Nongpoh is one of the 60 Legislative Assembly constituencies of Meghalaya state in India. It is part of Ri Bhoi district and is reserved for candidates belonging to the Scheduled Tribes. It falls under Shillong Lok Sabha constituency and its current MLA is Mayralborn Syiem of Indian National Congress.

Members of Legislative Assembly
The list of MLAs are given below

|-style="background:#E9E9E9;"
!Year
!colspan="2" align="center"|Party
!align="center" |MLA
!Votes
|-
|1972
|bgcolor="#DDDDDD"|
|align="left"| Independent
|align="left"| D. D. Lapang
|1166 
|-
|1978
|bgcolor="#00FFFF"|
|align="left"| Indian National Congress
|align="left"| D. D. Lapang
|2223 
|-
|1983
|bgcolor="#00FFFF"|
|align="left"| Indian National Congress
|align="left"| D. D. Lapang
|3017 
|-
|1988
|bgcolor="#00FFFF"|
|align="left"| Indian National Congress
|align="left"| D. D. Lapang
|4578
|-
|1993
|bgcolor="#0000B3"|
|align="left"| Hill State People's Democratic Party
|align="left"| Constantine Lyngdoh 
|7474 
|-
|1998 
|bgcolor="#00FFFF"|
|align="left"| Indian National Congress
|align="left"| D. D. Lapang
|9070
|-
|2003
|bgcolor="#00FFFF"|
|align="left"| Indian National Congress
|align="left"| D. D. Lapang
|7808 
|-
|2008
|bgcolor="#00FFFF"|
|align="left"| Indian National Congress
|align="left"| D. D. Lapang
|10974 
|-
|2013
|bgcolor="#00FFFF"|
|align="left"| Indian National Congress
|align="left"| D. D. Lapang
|10927 
|-
|2018
|bgcolor="#00FFFF"|
|align="left"| Indian National Congress
|align="left"| Mayralborn Syiem
|11119 
|}

Election results

2018

See also
List of constituencies of the Meghalaya Legislative Assembly
Nongpoh
Ri-Bhoi district
Shillong (Lok Sabha constituency)

References

Assembly constituencies of Meghalaya
Ri-Bhoi district